Riehm is a surname. People with the surname include:

 David Riehm (born 1988), American writer and filmmaker 
 Eduard Karl August Riehm (1830–1888), German Protestant theologian
 Karl-Hans Riehm (born 1951), West German hammer thrower
 Rolf Riehm (born 1937), German composer, oboist and academic teacher

German-language surnames

vi:Chương (họ)